"Too Many Friends" is a single by alternative rock band Placebo, the first single off of their seventh studio album Loud Like Love. The single was released on 8 July 2013, as a digital download but was actually released on 23 August 2013 in physical format as a limited edition CD and 7" single in Germany. The song deals with people on the internet and being far more close to friends on the internet, rather than off the computer. It is also about loneliness, which Placebo frontman Brian Molko said was the "modern version of, 'I’m sitting by the phone, waiting for you to call.'"

Music video
The band went to Los Angeles to make the music video with filmmaker Saman Kesh. American transgressive novelist Bret Easton Ellis provides a voiceover in the video as a narrator. The video, which premiered on YouTube, presents a "detective case" regarding a series of events occurring during a pool party.

Track listing
Digital download
Too Many Friends – 3:35

iTunes EP
Too Many Friends – 3:35
Outro – 2:24
Too Many Friends (The Bloody Beetroots Remix) – 3:48

Limited CD and 7" single
Too Many Friends – 3:35
Outro – 2:24

Charts

References

2013 singles
Placebo (band) songs
Songs written by Brian Molko
Songs written by Stefan Olsdal
Songs written by Steve Forrest (musician)
Songs written by William Patrick Lloyd
Universal Music Group singles
2013 songs